Guerville is a commune in the Seine-Maritime department in the Normandy region in northern France.

Geography

Population

Places of interest
 The remains (a motte and moat) of the old Norman castle.
 The church of St. Gilles, dating from the nineteenth century.
 The nineteenth century Château de la Grande-Vallée.
 The Château de La Haye.

See also
Communes of the Seine-Maritime department

References

Communes of Seine-Maritime